Sierra de Albarracín is a  long mountain range in the southwestern end of the Iberian System. Its highest point is the 1,856 m high summit known as Sierra Alta.

Description
This mountain range is named after the town of Albarracín, located at a height of 1,200 m. At the same time it gives its name to the Sierra de Albarracín comarca of Aragon, Spain. Monterde de Albarracín is located at the northern end of the range.

The Sierra de Albarracín is a rough-looking mountain chain with pine, oak and juniper forests and also many patches where the rock is exposed. Its summits are usually covered in snow in the winter and the average temperature is of 11 °C. It was formerly one of the most lonely and desolate areas of Spain and there were not even marked paths crossing its impenetrable forests and jagged ridges.

Metopoceras albarracina is an endemic moth of these mountains.

See also
Albarracín
Monterde de Albarracín
List of mountains in Aragon

References

External links

Albarracín on Diputación de Teruel
Turismo Albarracin
Turismo en la Sierra de Albarracín (Teruel)
The highest camping in Spain
Social organization, reproductive behavior and ecology of Leptothorax acervorum (Hymenoptera, Formicidae) from the Sierra de Albarracin in central Spain

Albarracin
Albarracin
Albarracin